John Cowsill (born March 2, 1956) is an American musician, best known for his work as a singer and drummer with his siblings' band The Cowsills. He has been a drummer and vocalist for The Beach Boys touring band, which featured original Beach Boy Mike Love and long time member Bruce Johnston. Cowsill has also played keyboards for the "Beach Boys Band" performing Al Jardine's and the late Carl Wilson's vocal parts. He also has performed and recorded with Jan and Dean.

Biography

The Cowsills 
In the wake of Beatlemania, John and three of his brothers, Bill, Bob, and Barry, would form their own group solely based around the Liverpool band. Soon after, their mother Barbara and sister Susan would also join. They signed to a label in 1965 and after releasing a few non-commercially successful singles, were transferred to MGM Records in 1967. Their first single with MGM was The Rain, the Park & Other Things.

John mainly backing vocals, although he sang lead on Silver Threads and Golden Needles. From 1967 to 1969, the family group would have more hit songs such as Indian Lake, We Can Fly, and Hair, they split in 1972, although John would re-appear with the band for most of its reformed tenures. The Cowsills were the main inspiration for The Partridge Family.

Tommy Tutone 
In the early 1980s, Cowsill recorded with the one-hit wonder band Tommy Tutone, playing percussion and singing back-up vocals on the band's hit, "867-5309/Jenny," although he did not appear in the video.

The Beach Boys 
Cowsill began playing with the Beach Boys touring band on keyboards in 2000.  He moved to the drums in 2008. His solos for the concerts include "Wild Honey," and "Sail On, Sailor." and also "Darlin" and "California Dreaming" on the 2022 tour. In 2011, Cowsill was confirmed to be performing alongside The Beach Boys on their 50th Anniversary Reunion Tour. Cowsill appears on the band's subsequent studio album, That's Why God Made the Radio (2012). He also performed on Mike Love's solo albums Unleash the Love (2017) and Reason for the Season (2018).

Other Works 
In 2017, Cowsill joined with Vicki Peterson and Bill Mumy as the band Action Skulls to release an album (also including posthumous contributions from the bassist Rick Rosas) entitled Angels Hear.

For a time, he was part of Dwight Twilley's band, as was his sister Susan Cowsill.

Personal Life 
In October 2003, he married Vicki Peterson of The Bangles.

Discography

The Cowsills

Albums

Extended plays

Singles

Tommy Tutone

Studio albums

Singles

The Beach Boys

Albums 

 That's Why God Made the Radio (2012)

Singles 

 That's Why God Made the Radio (2012)
 Isn't It Time (2012)

Mike Love

Albums 

 Unleash the Love (2017)
 Reason for the Season (2018)

References

External links
Cowsill discography
The Cowsills
The Cowsills: John
The Cowsills

1956 births
Living people
Musicians from Rhode Island
American keyboardists
The Beach Boys backing band members
The Cowsills members
The Partridge Family